Ivanildo Astrando Misidjan (born 8 July 1993) is a Surinamese professional footballer who plays as a centre-back for SVB Eerste Divisie club Broki and the Suriname national team.

International career 
Misidjan made a total of six appearances for the Suriname U20 national team at the 2013 CONCACAF U-20 Championship in Mexico. On 18 August 2018, he made his debut for the Suriname senior team, playing in a 4–0 friendly victory over French Guiana.

Honours 
Leo Victor
 SVB Cup: 2013–14
 Suriname President's Cup: 2014

References

External links 
 

1993 births
Living people
Surinamese footballers
Association football defenders
Sportspeople from Paramaribo
S.V. Leo Victor players
S.V. Broki players
SVB Eerste Divisie players
Suriname youth international footballers
Suriname under-20 international footballers
Suriname international footballers